Khan Baghalachi (also Romanized as Khān Baghalachī; also known as Khān Kandī) is a village in Chaldoran-e Jonubi Rural District, in the Central District of Chaldoran County, West Azerbaijan Province, Iran. At the 2006 census, its population was 241, in 50 families.

References 

Populated places in Chaldoran County